Pyrenacantha cordicula is a species of plant in the Icacinaceae family. It is found in Cameroon, Ivory Coast, Equatorial Guinea, and Ghana. Its natural habitat is subtropical or tropical moist lowland forests. It is threatened by habitat loss.

References

cordicula
Endangered plants
Taxonomy articles created by Polbot